Miguel Ángel Martín Perdiguero (born 14 October 1972 in Madrid) is a Spanish former professional road racing cyclist. He finished his career riding on the UCI ProTour for the Phonak Hearing Systems cycling team, with whom he had ridden since 2005.  His career highlights include winning the Clásica de San Sebastián and capturing the overall, points, and mountains competitions along with three stages at the Volta a Catalunya in 2004.

Major results

1998
 1st Stage 1 Grand Prix International Mitsubishi MR Cortez
 Vuelta a Mallorca
2nd Trofeo Manacor
3rd Trofeo Alcúdia
1999
 1st Clásica a los Puertos de Guadarrama
 1st Stage 1 Vuelta a Burgos
 2nd Clásica de Alcobendas
 2nd Subida al Naranco
 3rd Escalada a Montjuïc
2000
 1st Overall Vuelta a La Rioja 
1st  Points Classification 
1st Stage 4
 1st GP Llodio
 1st GP Miguel Indurain
 9th Clásica de San Sebastián
2001
 1st Stage 1 Vuelta a Asturias
 1st Stage 1 Clásica Internacional de Alcobendas
2002
 Bicicleta Vasca
1st  Mountains classification
1st Stage 3
 1st Stage 4 Setmana Catalana de Ciclisme
 1st Stage 3 Vuelta a Asturias
 3rd National Road Race Championships
2003
 1st Trofeo Pantalica
 Volta a la Comunitat Valenciana
1st  Points classification
1st Stage 4
 1st Stage 3 Vuelta a Castilla y León
 3rd Milano–Torino
 5th Giro di Lombardia
2004
 1st Clásica de San Sebastián
 1st  Overall Volta a Catalunya
1st  Points classification
1st  Mountains classification 
1st Stages 2, 3 & 4
 1st  Mountains classification Vuelta a Murcia
 1st Stages 1 & 2 Euskal Bizikleta
 1st Stage 5 Vuelta a Asturias
 2nd Overall Setmana Catalana de Ciclisme
1st  Points Classification
1st Combination classification
 2nd Subida al Naranco
 2nd GP Miguel Indurain
 2nd GP Llodio
 9th Milan–San Remo
2005
 3rd Clásica de Alcobendas
 5th Amstel Gold Race
 6th Overall Volta a Catalunya
 7th Liège–Bastogne–Liège
2006
 6th Liège–Bastogne–Liège
 7th Overall Tour of the Basque Country
 7th Amstel Gold Race

Grand Tour general classification results timeline

References

1972 births
Living people
Spanish male cyclists
Olympic cyclists of Spain
Cyclists at the 2000 Summer Olympics
Cyclists from Madrid
City councillors in the Community of Madrid